A Charlie Brown Thanksgiving is the tenth prime-time animated television special based upon the popular comic strip Peanuts, by Charles M. Schulz. It was originally aired on the CBS network on November 20, 1973, and won an Emmy Award the following year. It was the third holiday special after A Charlie Brown Christmas in 1965 and It's the Great Pumpkin, Charlie Brown in 1966.

Plot
In a cold open cameo, Lucy entices Charlie Brown to kick a football she is holding, calling it a Thanksgiving tradition; she pulls the ball away as usual, stating that some traditions fade away.

The Browns are preparing to go to their grandmother's for Thanksgiving dinner when Charlie Brown gets a phone call from Peppermint Patty, who is alone for Thanksgiving and wants to come over for dinner. (Peppermint Patty --uninvitedly-- invites herself over for Thanksgiving dinner at Charlie Brown's house.) Two quick subsequent phone calls from Peppermint Patty add Marcie and Franklin to the guest list for a dinner. Linus suggests to a perplexed Charlie Brown that he could have two Thanksgiving dinners. The first Thanksgiving feast can be for himself, Sally, Peppermint Patty, and the others, while the second one can be at his grandparents's house for his family. Charlie Brown says his cooking skills are limited to "cold cereal and maybe toast," so Linus recruits Snoopy and Woodstock to help. Snoopy sets up a ping pong table and chairs (sparring with a lawn chair that comes to life); later, Charlie Brown, Snoopy, Woodstock and Linus prepare a feast of toast with margarine, pan-fried popcorn, pretzel sticks and jelly beans, then Snoopy dresses himself and a reluctant Woodstock (at pop-gunpoint) in Pilgrim attire for the occasion, though Charlie Brown rejects the latter idea.

The guests arrive and make their way to the backyard for the Thanksgiving feast. Linus leads the group in prayer that details the First Thanksgiving in 1621, and then Snoopy serves up the feast. While Charlie Brown happily munches, Peppermint Patty scowls about the Thanksgiving meal's food. Peppermint Patty's initial shock at the unconventional meal quickly turns to outrage (after she ended up with toast, popcorn, pretzel sticks, and jelly beans --even though she was expecting turkey, stuffing, mashed potatoes, cranberry sauce, and pumpkin pie) and loudly complains about the meal to Charlie Brown, who timidly leaves the table in response. While Sally also happily munches, Peppermint Patty's tirade continues. She tells Marcie that it's supposed to be a real Thanksgiving dinner. However, Marcie asks her whether Charlie Brown invited her or if it was just her (Peppermint Patty) who invited herself. Coming to her senses, Peppermint Patty asks Marcie to apologize to Charlie Brown on her behalf (unintentionally paralleling The Courtship of Miles Standish); Marcie reluctantly agrees, but Peppermint Patty soon follows and apologizes to him herself. Following this, Charlie Brown is reminded by the clock that he and Sally are due at their grandmother's house for dinner, so he calls her and explains his situation. When he mentions his friends are there, and that they did not eat, his grandmother invites them all to Thanksgiving dinner, which is welcomed with cheers from everyone. As they all pile into the car to go to the Browns' grandmother's, they sing "Over the River and Through the Wood". After they sing the final lyric(s), Charlie Brown says there is only one thing wrong with the song's name/title/lyrics. He disqualifies the others and the song. Because (as spoken by Charlie Brown) his grandmother lives in a condominium. 

Snoopy and Woodstock go to the doghouse and cook up their own traditional Thanksgiving meal. They then pull the wishbone which Woodstock wins. Over the end credits, the two friends each devour a large piece of pumpkin pie then sit back with contented smiles as Woodstock pats his full stomach.

Broadcast history
The special first aired on CBS on November 20, 1973, and continued to air every year on that network (skipping 1982, 1983, and 1988) until November 23, 1989.

The Disney Channel and Nickelodeon returned the special for reairing in the 1990s (in the latter channel's case, under the "You're on Nickelodeon, Charlie Brown" umbrella of Peanuts productions) and then, in 2001, it moved, along with the rest of the Peanuts specials, to ABC. In contrast to CBS, ABC aired the special every year through 2019, on several days in the week leading up to Thanksgiving, and it had regularly won its time slot. As the special runs slightly over a half-hour with commercials, ABC typically filled the remaining portion of the full hour with other Peanuts programming. From 2008 to 2019, the remaining time was filled by a slightly abridged edit of "The Mayflower Voyagers," the premiere episode of the 1988 miniseries This Is America, Charlie Brown.

Starting in 2020, the special (along with the rest of the Peanuts library) will exclusively air on Apple TV+; under the terms of the agreement, Apple TV+ must provide a three-day window in November in which the special is available for free. On November 18, 2020 Apple announced they had reached an agreement to air the special on Sunday, November 22, 2020, the Sunday before Thanksgiving, commercial free on PBS and PBS Kids. In accordance with most PBS affiliates' non-commercial educational licenses, the special was presented on PBS unedited without commercial interruption, with only a brief underwriting spot before and after the special: "This special broadcast of A Charlie Brown Thanksgiving was made possible by Apple." Apple renewed the agreement with PBS in 2021 but did not renew it for 2022.

It is also broadcast in Canada, usually in early October in line with the Canadian observance of Thanksgiving. The special is aired on Family Channel as of 2018, with the special aired on the day before Thanksgiving and on Thanksgiving Day, which takes place on the second Monday of October in Canada.

Voice actors
 Todd Barbee as Charlie Brown
 Peter Robbins as Charlie Brown's screaming voice (archived)
 Robin Kohn as Lucy van Pelt
 Stephen Shea as Linus van Pelt
 Hilary Momberger as Sally Brown
 Christopher DeFaria as Patricia "Peppermint Patty" Reichardt 
 Jimmy Ahrens as Marcie
 Robin Reed as Franklin
 Bill Melendez as Snoopy and Woodstock

This is the last TV special that uses the same cast from Snoopy, Come Home, You're Not Elected, Charlie Brown, and There's No Time for Love, Charlie Brown. In the next TV special, Kohn, DeFaria, and Momberger would be succeeded in their respective roles by Melanie Kohn (Robin's younger sister), Donna Forman, and Lynn Mortensen respectively.

Music score
The music score for A Charlie Brown Thanksgiving was composed by Vince Guaraldi (except where noted) and conducted and arranged by John Scott Trotter. The score was performed by the Vince Guaraldi Quintet on July 17–18, August 6 and October 1, 1973, at Wally Heider Studios, featuring Tom Harrell (trumpet), Chuck Bennett (trombone), Seward McCain (electric bass) and Mike Clark (drums).

"Charlie Brown Blues" (aka "Play It Again, Charlie Brown"/"Charlie's Blues") (version 1)
"Thanksgiving Theme" (version 1, opening credits)
"Thanksgiving Theme" (version 2)
"Peppermint Patty"
"Little Birdie" (Vocal: Vince Guaraldi)
"Thanksgiving Interlude" (version 1)
"Is It James or Charlie?" (version 1)
"Linus and Lucy (with the band)"
"Fife and Drums Theme"
"Is It James or Charlie?" (version 2)
"Charlie Brown Blues" (aka "Play It Again, Charlie Brown" and "Charlie's Blues") (version 2)
"Thanksgiving Interlude" (version 2)
"Over the River and Through the Wood" (a cappella, Lydia Maria Child)
"Thanksgiving Theme" (version 3, with brass)
"Thanksgiving Theme" (version 4, end credits)

While an official soundtrack for the special has not been released, separate music cues have been scattered across several compilation albums beginning in 1998:
"Charlie Brown Blues" (version 1) and a composite edit of "Thanksgiving Theme" (consisting of versions 2 and 3) appeared on Charlie Brown's Holiday Hits (1998).
"Linus and Lucy" (with the band) was released on The Charlie Brown Suite & Other Favorites (2003).
"Little Birdie" and "Thanksgiving Theme" (version 3, with brass) appeared on Vince Guaraldi and the Lost Cues from the Charlie Brown Television Specials (2007) while "Is It James or Charlie?" (version 1) appeared on Vince Guaraldi and the Lost Cues from the Charlie Brown Television Specials, Volume 2 (2008).
"Peppermint Patty" (edited version) and "Is It James or Charlie?" (version 2) appeared on Peanuts Portraits (2010).

Home media
The special was released on RCA's SelectaVision CED format in 1982 as part of the A Charlie Brown Festival Vol. III compilation. It was released on VHS by Kartes Video Communications (later KVC Home Video) in 1987. It was released by Paramount Home Video on VHS on September 28, 1994 and was re-released in clamshell packaging on October 1, 1996.
A Charlie Brown Thanksgiving was released on DVD by Paramount Home Entertainment on September 12, 2000. It was re-released by Warner Home Video in remastered form on October 7, 2008. It was released on a Blu-ray/DVD Combo Pack by Warner Home Video on October 5, 2010. The special was released in a 40th anniversary deluxe edition DVD by Warner Home Video with the same features from previous editions on October 1, 2013. The deluxe edition DVD also features "The Mayflower Voyagers". The special was released on Ultra HD Blu-ray on October 24, 2017.

References

External links

 
 Recreating the Charlie Brown Thanksgiving Dinner article on X-Entertainment

Peanuts television specials
Thanksgiving television specials
Television shows directed by Bill Melendez
Television shows directed by Phil Roman
1970s American television specials
1973 in American television
1973 television specials
CBS television specials
Television shows written by Charles M. Schulz
1970s animated television specials